Lithium diphenylphosphide contains lithium and the organophosphorus anion with the formula (C6H5)2PLi.  It is an air-sensitive solid that is used in the preparation of diphenylphosphino compounds.  As an ether complex, the lithium salt is dark red.

Synthesis and reactions
The lithium, sodium, and potassium salts are prepared by reduction of chlorodiphenylphosphine, triphenylphosphine, or tetraphenyldiphosphine with alkali metals (M):  
(C6H5)2PCl  +  2 M   →  (C6H5)2PM  +  MCl
(C6H5)3P  +  2 M   →  (C6H5)2PM  +  MC6H5
(C6H5)4P2  +  2 M   →  2 (C6H5)2PM 
They can also be obtained by deprotonation of diphenylphosphine.

With water, the salts convert to diphenylphosphine:
(C6H5)2PLi  +  H2O   →   (C6H5)2PH  +  LiOH

With halocarbons, the salts react to give tertiary phosphines:
(C6H5)2PM  +  RX   →   (C6H5)2PR  +  MX

When treated with metal halides, lithium diphenylphosphide gives transition metal phosphido complexes.

Structure
Although treated as salts, alkali diphenylphosphides are highly aggregated in solution.  They adopt polymeric structures as solids.

Related compounds
 Sodium diphenylphosphide (CAS RN 4376-01-6)
 Potassium diphenylphosphide (CAS RN 15475-27-1)

References

Lithium salts
Organolithium compounds
Phenyl compounds
Phosphines